Orthofidonia flavivenata, the yellow-veined geometer moth, is a species of geometrid moth in the family Geometridae. It is found in North America.

The MONA or Hodges number for Orthofidonia flavivenata is 6430.

References

Further reading

 

Boarmiini
Articles created by Qbugbot
Moths described in 1898